Time and Tide is the eighth album by the New Zealand new wave band Split Enz, released in April 1982. It topped the album charts in New Zealand and Australia.

At the 1982 Countdown Australian Music Awards, Time and Tide was named Best Australian Album, despite being a New Zealand album.

The album was re-released in 2006 along with all of Split Enz's studio album catalogue. Some albums were rearranged, reordered or adjusted; Time and Tide, however, was left unchanged.

Track listing
 "Dirty Creature" (Neil Finn, Tim Finn & Nigel Griggs) – 4:02
 "Giant Heartbeat" (N. Finn & Griggs) – 3:57
 "Hello Sandy Allen" (N. Finn) – 3:51
 "Never Ceases to Amaze Me" (T. Finn) – 3:06
 "Lost for Words" (N. Finn, T. Finn & Griggs) – 3:02
 "Small World" (T. Finn) – 3:37
 "Take a Walk" (N. Finn) – 3:37
 "Pioneer" (Eddie Rayner) – 1:32
 "Six Months in a Leaky Boat" (T. Finn & Split Enz) – 4:21
 "Haul Away" (T. Finn) – 2:27
 "Log Cabin Fever" (N. Finn) – 4:36
 "Make Sense of It" (Noel Crombie, T. Finn, N. Finn, Griggs & Rayner) – 3:40

Personnel

Split Enz
 Tim Finn – vocals, piano
 Neil Finn – vocals, guitar
 Noel Crombie – drums, percussion
 Nigel Griggs – bass guitar
 Eddie Rayner – keyboards, percussion

Technical and art
 Produced by Hugh Padgham and Split Enz
 Recorded in Sydney, Australia, for Enz Productions
 Engineered by Hugh Padgham, assisted by David Price
 Mixed by Hugh Padgham and Split Enz
 Mastered by Ian Cooper and Howard Grey at Townhouse Studios, UK
 Art Direction: Jeff Ayeroff
 Cover design and photos by Noel Crombie

Charts

Weekly charts

Year-end charts

See also
 List of Top 25 albums for 1982 in Australia

Certifications and sales

References

Split Enz albums
1982 albums
Albums produced by Hugh Padgham
Mushroom Records albums